Mescitli can refer to:

 Mescitli, İspir
 Mescitli, Köprüköy
 Mescitli, Nazilli